Edward Thomas Austen (28 January 1820 – 10 June 1908) was an English cricketer. Austen's batting style is unknown.

The son of Sir Francis William Austen and Mary Gibson, Austen was born at Chawton, Hampshire. He was a nephew to the novelist Jane Austen. He studied at St John's College, Oxford, gaining his BA in 1846 and his MA in 1850. He played a single first-class cricket match for the Marylebone Cricket Club (MCC) against Oxford University in 1844 at the Magdalen Ground, Oxford. In a match which Oxford University won by 5 runs, Austen was run out for a duck in the MCC's first-innings, while he ended their second not out on 3.

Austen was later the rector at Barfrestone, Kent, a position he held from 1854 until his death on 10 June 1908.

References

External links

1820 births
1908 deaths
Austen family
People from Chawton
Alumni of St John's College, Oxford
English cricketers
Marylebone Cricket Club cricketers
19th-century English Anglican priests
Jane Austen
People from Dover District